NAIA independent schools are four-year institutional members of the National Association of Intercollegiate Athletics (NAIA) that do not have formal conference affiliations. NAIA schools that are not members of any other athletic conference are members of the Continental Athletic Conference (CAC), formerly the Association of Independent Institutions (AII), which provides member services to the institution and allows members to compete in postseason competition. The CAC has one member institution in the U.S. Virgin Islands and another in Canada's British Columbia. It provides services to the member institutions that are not fitting in any other NAIA conference and allows members to compete in postseason competition. The AII renamed itself the Continental Athletic Conference at the end of June 2021, citing the need to identify as a proper conference.

History

Chronological timeline
 2008 - The Association of Independent Institutions (AII) was founded by a select group of independent universities and colleges that do not have formal conference affiliations and provide member services to the institutions and allows them to compete in postseason competition. Charter members included the University of Alberta, Allen University, Ave Maria University, Brescia University, the University of British Columbia, Crichton College (later Victory University), California State University San Marcos (CSU San Marcos), Embry–Riddle Aeronautical University at Arizona (Embry–Riddle at Arizona), Fisk University, Holy Cross College (Indiana), the University of Houston–Victoria (UHV), Indiana University Northwest (Indiana–Northwest), Johnson & Wales University–Denver, Johnson & Wales University–North Miami, Kentucky Christian University, Lambuth University, Life University, Louisiana State University at Alexandria, Marygrove College, Morris College, Mountain State University, Our Lady of the Lake University, Park University, Patten University, Philander Smith College, the University of Regina, the College of Santa Fe, Simon Fraser University, Soka University of America, Southeastern University of Florida, Southern Virginia University, Southwestern College of Arizona (now Arizona Christian University), the University of St. Thomas of Texas, the State University of New York at Delhi (SUNY Delhi), Talladega College, Thomas University, the University of Victoria, Voorhees College (now Voorhees University), and Walla Walla University beginning in the 2008-09 academic year. Out of those AII member institutions during that time, only three competed in other athletic conferences for other sports as their primary home: Brescia and Mountain State for the Kentucky Intercollegiate Athletic Conference (KIAC), and Park for the Midlands Collegiate Athletic Conference (MCAC).
 2009 - Nine institutions left the AII to join their respective new home primary conferences: Ave Maria, Johnson & Wales–Miami and Southeastern (Fla.) to join the Sun Conference, Brescia's basketball teams to join the rest of its athletics program in the KIAC, Holy Cross (Ind.) to join the Chicagoland Collegiate Athletic Conference (CCAC), Our Lady of the Lake to join the Red River Athletic Conference (RRAC), Park to join the American Midwest Conference, and Santa Fe and Victory to cease operations, all effective after the 2008-09 academic year.
 2009 - Northern New Mexico College, Ohio Dominican University, and Truett McConnell College (now Truett McConnell University) joined the AII in the 2009–10 academic year.
 2010 - Four institutions left the AII to join their respective new home primary conferences: Alberta to realign its athletics program to the Canadian Interuniversity Sport (CIS), Fisk to join the Gulf Coast Athletic Conference (GCAC), Ohio Dominican to join the NCAA Division II ranks and the Great Lakes Intercollegiate Athletic Conference (GLIAC), and Truett McConnell to join the Southern States Athletic Conference (SSAC), all effective after the 2009–10 academic year.
 2010 - Benedictine University at Springfield, Central Baptist College, Lourdes College (now Lourdes University), and Warren Wilson College joined the AII in the 2010–11 academic year.
 2011 - Nine institutions left the AII, eight to join their respective new home primary conferences: Philander Smith and Talledega to join the GCAC, Regina to realign its athletics program to the CIS, Simon Fraser to realign its athletics program to the NCAA Division II ranks and the Great Northwest Athletic Conference (GNAC), St. Thomas (Tex.) to the RRAC, Benedictine–Springfield to join the American Midwest, Central Baptist to join the MCAC, and Lourdes to join the Wolverine–Hoosier Athletic Conference (WHAC), all effective after the 2010–11 academic year. The ninth, Lambuth, ceased operations.
 2011 - Dakota State University, Dickinson State University, the University of Jamestown, La Sierra University, Lawrence Technological University (Lawrence Tech), Marymount College (later Marymount California University), Mayville State University, Rochester College (now Rochester University), the Atlanta campus of the Savannah College of Art and Design (SCAD Atlanta), and Valley City State University joined the AII in the 2011–12 academic year.
 2012 - 13 institutions left the AII to join their respective new home primary conferences: Embry–Riddle at Arizona, Marymount (Cal.) and Soka to join the California Pacific Conference (Cal Pac), Life to join the TranSouth Athletic Conference (TSAC or TranSouth), Marygrove and Lawrence Tech to join the WHAC, Mountain State and Patten to cease operations, Southern Virginia and Warren Wilson to realign within the United States Collegiate Athletic Association (USCAA) [with Southern Virginia later applying to join the NCAA Division III ranks in the 2013–14 academic year], Arizona Christian to join the Golden State Athletic Conference (GSAC), Thomas (Ga.) to join the Sun Conference, Dickinson State to join the Frontier Conference, and SCAD Atlanta to join the Appalachian Athletic Conference (AAC), all effective after the 2011–12 academic year.
 2012 - Ashford University, Fisher College, the West Virginia Institute of Technology (WVU Tech), Wilberforce University, Georgia Gwinnett College, Indiana University Kokomo (Indiana–Kokomo), and Lindenwood University–Belleville joined the AII in the 2012–13 academic year.
 2013 - Six institutions left the AII to join their respective new home primary conferences: Voorhees to join the GCAC, Dakota State, Jamestown, Mayville State and Valley City State to join the newly-created North Star Athletic Association (NSAA), and Indiana–Kokomo to join the KIAC, all effective after the 2012–13 academic year.
 2013 - Dalton State College and the University of Antelope Valley joined the AII (with Life re-joining after one season in the recently-defunct TranSouth) in the 2013–14 academic year.
 2014 - Three institutions left the AII to join their respective new home primary conferences: Life to join the Mid-South Conference, LSU–Alexandria to join the RRAC, and Dalton State to join the SSAC, all effective after the 2013–14 academic year.
 2014 - Texas A&M University–Texarkana, Lincoln Christian University, Washington Adventist University, University of Winnipeg, and Trinity Lutheran College joined the AII in the 2014–15 academic year.
 2015 - Four institutions left the AII to join their respective new home primary conferences: Cal State–San Marcos to join the NCAA Division II ranks and the California Collegiate Athletic Association (CCAA), Houston–Victoria to the RRAC, Walla Walla to the Cascade Collegiate Conference (CCC), and Antelope Valley to join the Cal Pac, all effective after the 2014–15 academic year.
 2015 - Central Christian College of Kansas, Clarke University, the College of the Ozarks (CofO), Governors State University, Haskell Indian Nations University, Mount Mercy University, York College of Nebraska (now York University of Nebraska), and Providence Christian College joined the AII in the 2015–16 academic year. Out of those AII member institutions during that time, only one competed in other athletic conferences for other sports as their primary home: Providence Christian for the Cal Pac.
 2016 - Eight institutions left the AII to join their respective new home primary conferences: Allen to the AAC, Ashford and Trinity Lutheran to cease operations, Texas A&M–Texarkana to join the RRAC, Winnipeg to realign its athletics program to the CIS, Clarke and Mount Mercy to join the Heart of America Athletic Conference (HAAC), and York (Neb.) to join the Kansas Collegiate Athletic Conference, all effective after the 2015–16 academic year.
 2016 - Crowley's Ridge College, Silver Lake College of the Holy Family (later Holy Family College), Stillman College, and the University of the Virgin Islands joined the AII in the 2016–17 academic year.
 2017 - Two institutions left the AII to join their respective new home primary conferences: Rochester to join the WHAC, and Central Christian to join the Sooner Athletic Conference (SAC), both effective after the 2016–17 academic year.
 2017 - Cleary University, Florida College, the University of Maine at Fort Kent (UMFK), Rust College, and the College of St. Joseph joined the AII in the 2017–18 academic year.
 2018 - Eight institutions left the AII to join their respective new home primary conferences: British Columbia to realign its athletics program to the U Sports, Johnson & Wales–Denver to join the NCAA Division III ranks and the Southern Collegiate Athletic Conference (SCAC), SUNY Delhi to join the NCAA Division III ranks and the North Atlantic Conference (NAC), Cleary to the WHAC, Stillman and Florida College to join the SSAC, Rust to join the GCAC, and Maine–Fort Kent (UMFK) to realign its athletics program with the USCAA, all effective after the 2017–18 academic year.
 2018 - Florida Memorial University, Green Mountain College, Cottey College, Lincoln College, Pennsylvania State University Schuylkill, and Villa Maria College joined the AII in the 2018–19 academic year.
 2019 - Five institutions left the AII to join their respective new home primary conferences: Indiana–Northwest to join the CCAC, Kentucky Christian to join the AAC, Green Mountain and St. Joseph (Vt.) to cease operations, and Villa Maria to realign its athletics program with the USCAA, all effective after the 2018–19 academic year.
 2019 - Bacone College joined the AII in the 2019–20 academic year.
 2020 - Two institutions left the AII to join their respective new home primary conferences: Holy Family to cease operations, and Lincoln (Ill.) to join the CCAC, both effective after the 2019–20 academic year.
 2021 - Two institutions left the AII to join their respective new home primary conferences: Fisk to re-join the GCAC, and the CofO to fully align with the National Christian College Athletic Association (NCCAA), both effective after the 2020–21 academic year.
 2021 - The AII was rebranded as the Continental Athletic Conference in the 2021–22 academic year.
 2021 - Iowa Wesleyan University and Arkansas Baptist College joined the Continental in the 2021–22 academic year.
 2022 - Three institutions left the Continental to join their respective new home primary conferences: Wilberforce to join the Mid-South, Lincoln Christian to discontinue its athletics program, and Cottey to join the American Midwest, all effective after the 2021–22 academic year.
 2022 - The University of South Carolina Beaufort (USC Beaufort), Indiana University–Purdue University Columbus (IUPUC), and North American University joined the Continental in the 2022–23 academic year.
 2023 - Four institutions left the Continental to join their respective new home primary conferences: Virgin Islands to join the GCAC, Iowa Wesleyan to the American Midwest, USC Beaufort to fully realign in the NCAA Division II ranks and the Peach Belt Conference (PBC), and IUPUC to join the River States, all effective after the 2022–23 academic year.

Member schools
Schools that competes as independent in some sports that their own conference doesn't sponsor, competes in the CAC as affiliate members (except football).

Current full members
Departing members are highlighted in pink.

Notes

Former full members

Notes

See also 
 NAIA independent football schools
 NCAA Division I independent schools
 NCAA Division II independent schools
 NCAA Division III independent schools

References

External links
 Continental Athletic Conference website

Continental
Sports organizations established in 2008
Sports in the United States Virgin Islands
Sport in British Columbia